Crisis Route is an upcoming Hong Kong action film written and directed by Oxide Pang, produced by and starring Andy Lau. Lau plays an international security expert who combats against hijackers on board the Airbus A380.

The film was first announced in March 2020 and production officially began on 27 September 2021 and ended on 19 November 2021.

Plot
Gao Haojun is a former Special Police officer. One time while subduing robbers who were robbing a jewelry shop, Gao accidentally blinds his daughter, Xiaojun, which shatters his family and is guilt ridden as a result. After his wife, Yuan, leaves him with their daughter, Gao resigns from the police force and becomes an international security expert. Years later, Gao bumps into his ex-wife and daughter while boarding the luxurious Airbus A380. However, during the flight, 12 hijackers seize the plane and hold its 800 passengers hostage while at over 10,000 feet in the air. As the hijackers mercilessly kill passengers on the economy class, Gao steps forward and engages in a battle of brains and brawns against the hijackers where Xiaojun also secretly assists her father by providing him intel.

Cast
Andy Lau as Gao Haojun (高皓軍), an international security expert and former Special Police officer.
Zhang Zifeng as Gao Xiaojun (高小軍), Gao's 18-year-old blind daughter who has great observation skills despite her disability.
Qu Chuxiao
Liu Tao as Fu Yuan (傅源), Gao's ex-wife and Xiaojun's mother.
Guo Xiaodong as Li Hangyu (李航宇), CEO of Hangyu Airlines.
Jiang Mengjie
Rasyad Faishal as Ali
Jiang Chao
Irfani Zhang as Ren Hui
Gao Shuguang
Wang Longzheng
Eric Chou
Zhang Yao
Zhang Yang

Production
Universe Entertainment chairman Daneil Lam first announced the film in March 2020, where it was titled A380, and was in talks with Andy Lau to star while production was set to begin in summer of the year.

On 9 March 2021, it was announced that Lau will be starring in the film as well as serving as producer, with Alvin Lam as co-producing and Oxide Pang directing. Liu Tao and Zhang Zifeng were also confirmed to be participating in the film, respectively playing the wife and daughter of Lau's character. With the film's title changed to Crisis Route, production was set to begin in early September of the year.

Principal photography for the film officially began on 27 September 2021, which was also Lau's 60th birthday, in Qingdao. The film held a production commencement ceremony that day as well as a birthday celebration for Lau. An interactive teaser poster was released which features a QR code when scanned with a cellular phone, an announcement of a plane hijacking can heard spoken by actor Guo Xiaodong, who plays a CEO of an airline company in the film. Being the first Chinese-language film to feature the interior of the Airbus A380, the film reportedly spent HK$300 million to build a 1:1 replica of the aircraft.

Production for Crisis Route officially wrapped up on 19 November 2021.

See also
Andy Lau filmography

References

Upcoming films
2020s action thriller films
Hong Kong action thriller films
Chinese action thriller films
Cantonese-language films
Mandarin-language films
Films produced by Andy Lau
Films directed by Oxide Pang
Films about aircraft hijackings
Films about terrorism in Asia
Films set on airplanes
Films shot in Shandong
Airbus A380